Trichopenthea macularia is a species of beetle in the family Cerambycidae, and the only species in the genus Trichopenthea. It was described by Pascoe in 1867.

References

Pteropliini
Beetles described in 1867